Toby-Alexander Smith (born 26 February 1991) is an English actor, known for portraying the role of Gray Atkins in the BBC soap opera EastEnders from 2019 to 2022.

Early life and education
Smith was born on 26 February 1991 in Lichfield, Staffordshire and developed a passion for acting whilst at school. He went to Arts Educational Schools in London, where he trained as an actor.

Career
His first television appearance was in an episode of the American Epix drama series Berlin Station in 2016. He then appeared in the BBC soap opera Doctors as Jason Carswell. In 2019, Smith appeared as Terry in the series Flack  and  later in the DC universe's Krypton as Lo-Ran.

On 11 March 2019, it was announced that Smith had joined the cast of EastEnders as Gray Atkins, the husband of Chantelle Atkins, played by Jessica Plummer. His first appearance was in the episode broadcast on 29 March 2019. In episodes broadcast in July 2019, it is revealed that Smith's character Gray has been domestically abusing his wife Chantelle. Smith alongside Plummer and the EastEnders team, worked closely with Women's Aid and Refuge to ensure that the domestic abuse storyline had been told accurately. Commenting on the storyline, Smith said: "I just hope that anyone experiencing any sort of behaviour like that will talk about it and relate to it. I’ve already been told by Woman’s Aid that people have contacted them and said they think their friend is in a similar situation to Gray and Chantelle in EastEnders." This led to Smith becoming an ambassador for Women's Aid. In September 2020, the storyline ended with Gray murdering Chantelle. In February 2022, it was announced that Smith would be leaving the series, and his character departed in March 2022. For their portrayal of domestic violence, Smith and Plummer were nominated for a BAFTA award in 2021, and Smith was also shortlisted for "Best Villain" at the Inside Soap Awards in 2020 and longlisted in 2021.

Personal life
Smith has been in a relationship with Emmerdale actress Amy Walsh, sister of Kimberley Walsh, since 2020, having met in the Strictly Come Dancing audience in 2019. They have a daughter, Bonnie-Mae, born in December 2021. The couple live in East London.

Smith plays rugby and can also sing and dance.

Filmography

Awards and nominations

References

External links 
 

1991 births
Living people
English television actors
English male soap opera actors
People educated at the Arts Educational Schools
People from Lichfield
Actors from Staffordshire
21st-century English male actors